Noord is a borough of Rotterdam. The municipal portion is formed by the Delfshavense Schie, the Highway 20 (A20), the Rotte and the rails. The borough had 51,796 inhabitants in 2017.

Neighborhoods 
The borough Noord consists of the neighborhoods:
 Liskwartier
 Oude Noorden
 Agniesebuurt
 Provenierswijk
 Blijdorp (with the same named zoo)
 Bergpolder

Transport 
Noord is served by three Rotterdam tram lines (Tram 4, 8, and 25), four bus lines (Bus 33, 38, 40, and 44), and Blijdorp RandstadRail station.

The Rotterdam Noord railway station is located on the northern border of the borough. Prior to 2006, the borough was also served by the Rotterdam Bergweg and Rotterdam Hofplein stations, both located on the Hofpleinlijn. The Hofpleinlijn was converted in 2006 to light rail with Rotterdam Bergweg closing the same year. Rotterdam Hofplein was closed in 2010 with the opening of the Blijdorp RandstadRail station which integrated the Rotterdam Metro with RandstadRail.

References

External links
Official Site
Noord (board) in Dutch

Boroughs of Rotterdam